Ilo Wallace (née Browne; March 10, 1888 – February 22, 1981) was the wife of Henry A. Wallace, the 33rd vice president of the United States. She was the second lady of the United States from 1941 until 1945. She was the sponsor of the battleship .

Born in Indianola, Iowa, she was the daughter of James Lytle Browne and his wife, the former Harriet Lindsay.

She attended Simpson College before transferring to study voice at Drake University.

She married Henry Agard Wallace in Des Moines, Iowa, on May 20, 1914. They had three children: Henry Browne Wallace (1915–2005), Robert Browne Wallace (1918–2002), and Jean Browne Wallace (1920–2011). Her husband later became the editor-in-chief of Wallace's Farmer, an influential Midwestern farming magazine that had been founded by his father, Henry Cantwell Wallace, who was the United States Secretary of Agriculture from 1921 to 1924.

A small inheritance she received from her parents enabled the Wallaces and their business partners to establish, in 1926, the Hi-Bred Corn Company, which developed and distributed hybrid corn and eventually transformed agriculture. The company is now known as Pioneer Hi-Bred International, the world's second largest seed company.

On February 22, 1981, she died at the Wallace estate, Farvue Farm, in South Salem, New York. Her funeral was private at her family's request.

References

External links 
 

|-

1888 births
1981 deaths
Monmouth College alumni
People from Indianola, Iowa
People from South Salem, New York
Second ladies of the United States
Wallace family of Iowa